Willy-Arnaud Zobo Boly (born 3 February 1991) is a professional footballer who plays as a centre-back for Premier League club Nottingham Forest and the Ivory Coast national team.

Club career

Auxerre
Born in Melun, Seine-et-Marne, Boly played youth football for three clubs, also having a three-year spell at the INF Clairefontaine academy. He made his senior debut with AJ Auxerre's reserves and, in February 2011, he signed his first professional contract after agreeing to a three-year deal with an option for a fourth.

On 16 April 2011, Boly made his Ligue 1 debut by playing the full 90 minutes in a 1–0 away win against Toulouse FC. He scored his first goal in the competition the following matchday, in a 1–1 home draw to RC Lens.

Boly was an undisputed starter in the 2011–12 season (33 games, one goal), but the AJA were relegated to Ligue 2 after finishing last.

Braga
On 1 September 2014, Boly moved to Portugal and joined S.C. Braga on a four-year deal. He spent his first season with the B-team, in the Segunda Liga.

Porto
On 31 August 2016, Boly signed a five-year contract with FC Porto with a €45 million buyout clause. He played only eight competitive matches during his spell, including the 1–0 away loss against Juventus F.C. for the last-16 stage of the UEFA Champions League where he featured the second half after coming on as a substitute for André Silva.

Wolverhampton Wanderers
On 8 July 2017, Boly joined EFL Championship club Wolverhampton Wanderers on a season-long loan, reuniting him with his former head coach Nuno Espírito Santo. He made his competitive debut for Wolverhampton on the opening day of the 2017–18 season in a 1–0 home win against Middlesbrough, and scored his first goal with them on 31 October to help Wolves win 2–0 away against Norwich City.

After making 37 official appearances and helping them achieve promotion, Boly signed a permanent contract with Wolves. He made his Premier League debut on 11 August 2018, in a 2–2 home draw against Everton. He scored his first goal in the competition two weeks later in a 1–1 home draw to Manchester City, but the goal proved controversial as television replays showed the ball was deflected into the goal by his forearm after glancing off his head.

Boly scored his first ever goal in UEFA European competition in Wolves's 2019–20 UEFA Europa League Group Stage game against Beşiktaş in Istanbul on 3 October 2019, a game that Wolves won 1–0.

Boly fractured his left fibula in training on 26 October 2019, necessitating surgery to insert a plate and screws on 30 October 2019. Boly returned from this injury in Wolves's 0–0 draw away to Manchester United on 1 February 2020, although he had been an unused substitute in Wolves's previous Premier League fixture at home to Liverpool on 23 January 2020.

Boly scored his first goal of the 2020–21 season, and his first Premier League goal since the 2018–19 season, on 16 January 2021 against West Bromwich Albion in the Black Country derby.

On 5 April 2021, after returning from playing with his national team in the 2021 Africa Cup of Nations qualifications, Wolves announced that Boly had caught COVID-19, and was self-isolating in line with government guidance. Wolves's head coach, Nuno Espírito Santo, announced after Wolves's Premier League game with West Bromwich Albion on 3 May 2021 that Boly was suffering the effects of long covid, ruling him out from appearing for Wolves in the game that evening. Boly would not feature for Wolves again until 19 May 2021, when he played the full 90 minutes of the away Premier League game at Everton.

Nottingham Forest
On 1 September 2022, Boly signed with Premier League side Nottingham Forest on a two-year deal for an undisclosed fee.

International career
Born to Ivorian parents, Boly represented France at under-16, under-17 and under-19 levels.

Boly switched to represent the Ivory Coast national team in 2020. He debuted for the Ivory Coast in a 2–1 2021 Africa Cup of Nations qualification win over Madagascar on 12 November 2020.

Career statistics

Club

International

International goals
Scores and results list Ivory Coast's goal tally first. Score column indicates score after each Boly goal.

Honours
Braga
Taça de Portugal: 2015–16

Wolverhampton Wanderers
EFL Championship: 2017–18

Individual
PFA Team of the Year: 2017–18 Championship

References

External links

Profile at the Nottingham Forest F.C. website
 
 

1991 births
Living people
Sportspeople from Melun
Citizens of Ivory Coast through descent
Ivorian footballers
Ivory Coast international footballers
French footballers
France youth international footballers
French sportspeople of Ivorian descent
Association football defenders
Ligue 1 players
Ligue 2 players
AJ Auxerre players
Primeira Liga players
Liga Portugal 2 players
S.C. Braga B players
S.C. Braga players
FC Porto players
Premier League players
English Football League players
Wolverhampton Wanderers F.C. players
Nottingham Forest F.C. players
Ivorian expatriate footballers
French expatriate footballers
Expatriate footballers in Portugal
Expatriate footballers in England
Ivorian expatriate sportspeople in Portugal
Ivorian expatriate sportspeople in England
French expatriate sportspeople in Portugal
French expatriate sportspeople in England
Footballers from Seine-et-Marne